The Trophée des Gastlosen ("trophy of the Gastlosen") is a Swiss competition of ski mountaineering, which is carried out annually in the Gastlosen, near Jaun, since 1993.

The history of the Trophée des Gastlosen goes back to 1987, when Erhard Loretan had the idea to carry out the Patrouille des Poyets. The Trophée des Gastlosen has been part of the Swiss cup of ski mountaineering (Coupe Suisse de Ski Alpinisme) since 1995, was also part of the World Cup of skimountaineering as well as part of the Trophée des Alpes in 2002.

Courses 
The long distance course A includes a total altitude difference (ascent) of 2,190 m and a total altitude difference for downhill skiing of 2,230 m.

External links

References 

Gastlosen
Skiing competitions in Switzerland
Mountaineering in Switzerland